Henri-Louis Gagnon (September 13, 1881 – June 16, 1964) was a Canadian politician.

Born in Lambton, Quebec, the son of Louis Gagnon and Sobronie Bélanger, Gagnon was elected to the Legislative Assembly of Quebec for Frontenac in 1931. A Liberal, he was defeated in 1935. He was mayor of Lambton in 1935 and 1936. He was re-elected in 1939 and defeated in 1944.

He died in Lambton in 1964.

References

1881 births
1964 deaths
People from Estrie
Quebec Liberal Party MNAs
Mayors of places in Quebec